The Tri-County Conference  is a high school conference in north central Illinois. The conference participates in athletics and activities in the Illinois High School Association. The conference incorporates 8 small public and 2 small private high schools, with enrollments between 82-428 students in LaSalle, Livingston, Marshall, Putnam, and Woodford counties.

History 
The first year of competition for the Tri-County was 1927 with ten charter schools: Hennepin, Henry, Hopkins Township in Granville, Lacon, Lostant, Magnolia, Senachwine Township in Putnam, McNabb Swaney, Tonica, and Varna. During the lifetime of the conference, most of these ten very small rural schools have remained in the league in one form or another. Some have left and returned and many of them have consolidated to become new entities. Regardless, the conference has changed many times over the years.

The first two schools to consolidate were Henry and Senachwine Township High Schools. The new high school became known as Henry-Senachwine Consolidated High School beginning in the fall of 1947 and would be located in Putnam, Illinois. The following year, Magnolia High School merged into Swaney High School near the town of McNabb, ceasing the existence of the Magnolia Pirates. In 1949, Varna High School consolidated with Lacon High School to create Mid-County High School, located in Varna. Sparland, a team that was part of the Tri-County but left for the Little 6 Conference in 1958, consolidated with Mid-County High School to form Midland High School in 1995.

Rutland joined the Tri-County in the early 1930's, however, they would leave for the Mid State Conference during a consolidation with the Minonk-Dana School District in 1956. This new high school would be known as Minonk-Dana-Rutland. Toluca and Wenona High Schools joined the Tri-County in the early 1930's, however, in 1992 they consolidated with Minonk-Dana-Rutland to create Fieldcrest High School located in Minonk, Illinois. Fieldcrest remained in the Mid State Conference.

Some small schools would cease operations during the course of time. Original member, Lostant High School in Lostant, Illinois, remained a member of the conference until 1958 when it would join the Little 6 Conference. They would return to the Tri-County in 1961, however, in 1993 the school closed due to financial constraints. Students from Lostant were given options to attend one of four nearby schools; Fieldcrest, Putnam County, Streator, or LaSalle-Peru.

During the 1950s and 60s, there was a push in the state to consolidate rural districts. Several schools in the Tri-County followed the initiative and either merged or consolidated. In 1956, the high schools of Roanoke and Benson, long-time rivals, consolidated to form Roanoke-Benson High School and continue to be a member of the conference. Washburn High School, located in Washburn, Illinois was a school that had existed in the league since 1929, however, it would consolidate with the high school from Lowpoint to create Lowpoint-Washburn High School in 1952. In 1966, two charter schools, Hennepin and Hopkins Township, would consolidate with previously consolidated Magnolia-Swaney High School to form Putnam County High School.

During the tenure of the Tri-County, schools like Eureka, Bureau Valley, and Peoria Christian joined and left. Another example of a school that would join the league and leave is DePue High School. DePue would leave the Indian Valley Conference in 1994, join the Tri-County, only to leave in 2020 to join the Little Ten Conference. Bradford High School, who joined the league in 1994, was deactivated in 2001 based on low enrollment. Students from Bradford were given the choice of attending Bureau Valley, Henry-Senachwine, or Stark County High Schools.

For nearly a century, the Tri-County has remained in operation with at least six high schools. Currently the league consists of six full members and four partial members, the full members are; Putnam County, Henry-Senachwine, Roanoke-Benson,  Streator Woodland, Varna Midland, and Lowpoint-Washburn.  Beginning in 2023-24 school year, Peru St. Bede, Dwight and Ottawa Marquette will compete in the Tri-County for all sports except football, which will compete in the newly formed Chicago Prairie League. Seneca, also a partial member of the Tri-County, plays in the Vermilion Valley (South) Conference for football.

Member schools

Previous Members

Sources:IHSA Conferences, and IHSA Member Schools Directory

Membership timeline 

 ''Sources:Illinois High School Glory Days,

Boys Basketball Tournament Championships

Tri-County Conference Tournament Championships

References

2015 Championship Game story from Ottawa Times

Illinois high school sports conferences